Baijnath, also spelled Baidyanath, is a village in Ramgarh block of Kaimur district, Bihar, India. Located 9 km south of Ramgarh, it is the site of an old Shiva temple built during the time of the Pratihara dynasty. As of 2011, its population was 2,482, in 380 households.

References 

Villages in Kaimur district